The sculpture of Emperors Yan and Huang is a monument in China that was carved from a mountain on the Yellow River. They depict the two mythical emperors Yan Di and Huang Di. The construction lasted 20 years and was completed in 2007, at a cost of US$22.5 million. They are located in Zhengzhou, the capital of Henan province, People's Republic of China. The statues commemorate politics and the economy.

See also
 List of tallest statues
 Three Sovereigns and Five Emperors

References

Colossal statues in China
Stone sculptures in China
Outdoor sculptures in China
2007 sculptures
Tourist attractions in Zhengzhou
Buildings and structures completed in 2007
2007 establishments in China
Buildings and structures in Zhengzhou
Yan Emperor